The governor of the Eastern Province, Sri Lanka ( Nægenahira palāth āndukāravarayā), is the head of the provincial government and exercises executive power over subjects devolved to the Eastern Provincial Council. The governor is appointed by the president of Sri Lanka for a period of five years. The current governor is Anuradha Yahampath.

Governors

References

External links
 Eastern Provincial Council

 
Eastern